Pear Ridge is an area of Port Arthur, Texas, United States that used to be a separate city in Jefferson County.

The city incorporated in 1935. By 1986, Port Arthur had taken control of Pear Ridge.

Education
Pear Ridge is within the Port Arthur Independent School District

External links
 

Port Arthur, Texas
Former cities in Texas
Geography of Jefferson County, Texas